Forsyth is a St. Louis MetroLink station. This below-grade, open-air station is located at the intersection of Forest Park Parkway and Forsyth Boulevard on the border of University City and Clayton.

The station primarily serves Washington University's West Campus, The Ritz-Carlton Saint Louis, and downtown Clayton.

The station includes the sculpture Hoi Polloi by Lindsey Stouffer. Its perforated stainless-steel screens appear to shimmer as people walk by, thanks to an optical illusion known as the moiré effect. At night, the screens are lit from within, diffusing light like enormous lanterns. The screens also provide some protection from the elements. Metro's Arts in Transit program commissioned the work in 2006.

Station layout
The platforms are reached by stairs on Forsyth Boulevard's south side and by stairs and switchback ramps on its north side.  Half of the platform is under the Forsyth overpass for shelter.

References

External links 
 St. Louis Metro
 Forsyth station satellite view

MetroLink stations in St. Louis County, Missouri
Railway stations in the United States opened in 2006
Blue Line (St. Louis MetroLink)
Railway stations located underground in Missouri